Señora is a 1988 Venezuelan telenovela written by José Ignacio Cabrujas and produced by Radio Caracas Televisión. The telenovela lasted 229 episodes and was distributed internationally by RCTV International.

Maricarmen Regueiro and Carlos Mata starred as the main protagonists with Caridad Canelón as the main antagonist.

Synopsis
Young, mischievous and rebellious, Eugenia has been sentenced to five years in prison for a minor offense. She knows that District Attorney Diego Mendoza is responsible for the unusually harsh sentence and she vows to get revenge. A few years later, upon her release, Eugenia's only family is the woman who raised her. But the woman dies a few days later, leaving only a woman's name on a piece of paper and a message saying it was the truth of her past.  Later, a terrible accident brings Eugenia face to face with the man who put her in jail. Fleeing the police, Eugenia goes to work for a domineering woman who blackmails her, but who has a powerful influence on her life. In this new world, Eugenia meets a man who falls in love with her and worships her, but Eugenia has no time for love. She is obsessed with her passion for vengeance against the man who ruined her life. Eugenia cannot know that fate, in all its irony, has prepared a trap for her.

Cast

Caridad Canelón as Constitucion Méndez
Maricarmen Regueiro as Eugenia Montiel
Carlos Mata as Diego Mendoza
Flavio Caballero as Anselmo Itriago
Amalia Perez Diaz as Endrina Montoya
Maria Teresa Acosta as Candida Montoya
Marisela Berti as Candela Benitez
Cristina Reyes as Pilar Lujan de Mendoza
Jaime Araque as Alvaro
Charles Barry as Padre Peralta
Umberto Buonocuore as Jacinto Perdomo
Pedro Durán as Ildelmaro Torres
Carolina López as Silvina
Marlene Maceda as Debora Luján
Pedro Marthan as Isaias Luján
Marialejandra Martín as Irina Perdomo
Ignacio Navarro as Eleazar Rangel
Irma Palmieri as Helena
Arquimedes Rivero as Juez Pantoja
Hylene Rodríguez as Jimena Itriago
Victoria Roberts as Altagracia Perdomo
Elisa Stella as Eloisa
Lourdes Valera as Zoraida
Carlos Villamizar as Aquiles Mendoza
Virginia Urdaneta as Mercedes 
Carlos Flores as López
Fran Moreno as Efrain Martinez 
Carlos Cámara Jr. as Kennedy
Jose Daniel Bort as Humberto
Ricardo Hernández as Manuel

References

External links
Señora at the Internet Movie Database
Opening Credits

1988 telenovelas
RCTV telenovelas
Venezuelan telenovelas
1988 Venezuelan television series debuts
1988 Venezuelan television series endings
Spanish-language telenovelas
Television shows set in Venezuela